Aaj Kamran Khan Kay Sath (previously Kamran Khan Show) was a Pakistani television current affairs talk show that aired every weekday on Geo News. The show was hosted by Kamran Khan, directed by Junaid Mumtaz, and produced by Asmat Mallick.

History
Aaj Kamran Khan Kay Sath focused on major stories of the day, with Kamran Khan adding his own expert analysis of the topics as well as soliciting the views of famous journalists, anchors, and political figures in Pakistan. In a one-hour time slot, Aaj Kamran Khan Kay Sath updated viewers on current affairs and other similar subjects. Geo TV broadcast Aaj Kamran Khan Kay Sath with anchor Kamran Khan from Monday to Thursday. The show was initially called Kamran Khan Show and was broadcast on Geo News. After some time, anchor Kamran Khan left the show which returned and included audience comments and requests and its later, full name. Kamran Khan has left GEO news. On 24 July 2014, Geo news broadcast the last episode of Aaj Kamran Khan Kay Sath and the show has now been replaced by Aaj Shahzeb Khanzada Kay Sath.

References

External links
 Official website

Geo News
Pakistani television talk shows